Sagardighi may refer to:
 Sagardighi, Bangladesh
 Sagardighi, Murshidabad, in Sagardighi community development block
 Sagardighi (community development block), Murshidabad district, West Bengal, India
 Sagardighi, Cooch Behar, pond in Cooch Behar, West Bengal, India